is a song by Japanese rock band Asian Kung-Fu Generation. It was released as the single on February 20, 2013, and it was used as the theme song for the 2013 film, A Story of Yonosuke.

Music video 
The music video for "Ima wo Ikite" was directed by A Story of Yonosuke's director, Shūichi Okita. The video features Kengo Kora as a college student (like in the film's story), living together with his friends. Band members appear in a cameo, where they and the college students look at an attractive girl. This is the second time Kora appeared in Asian Kung-Fu Generation's music video after Shinseiki no Love Song.

Track listing

Charts

Release history

References 

Asian Kung-Fu Generation songs
2013 singles
Songs written by Masafumi Gotoh
Songs written for films
2013 songs
Ki/oon Music singles